Yana Belomoyna (also transliterated Iana Belomoina, born 2 November 1992) is a Ukrainian cross-country mountain biker. She holds the 2017 UCI Cross-country Women's Elite #1 ranking.  At the 2012 Summer Olympics, she competed in the Women's cross-country at Hadleigh Farm, finishing in 13th place. She was the 2014 UCI Mountain Bike World Cup champion in the U23 category.

Career achievements

Major results

2020
 3rd  European Mountain Bike Championships XCO

References

External links
  (2012 Summer Olympics)
  (2016 Summer Olympics)
 

Cross-country mountain bikers
Ukrainian female cyclists
1992 births
Sportspeople from Lutsk
Living people
Olympic cyclists of Ukraine
Cyclists at the 2012 Summer Olympics
Cyclists at the 2016 Summer Olympics
Cyclists at the 2015 European Games
European Games competitors for Ukraine
Cyclists at the 2020 Summer Olympics
Sportspeople from Volyn Oblast
21st-century Ukrainian women